Smuggler's Gold is a 1951 American adventure film directed by William Berke and starring Cameron Mitchell, Amanda Blake and Carl Benton Reid.

Plot

Cast
 Cameron Mitchell as Mike Sloan  
 Amanda Blake as Susan Hodges  
 Carl Benton Reid as 'Pop' Hodges  
 Peter M. Thompson as Chief Frank Warren 
 William 'Bill' Phillips as Chet Blake  
 William Forrest as Arthur Rayburn  
 Robert B. Williams as Hank Peters  
 Harlan Warde as George Brewster  
 Paul Campbell as Ensign Davis  
 Al Hill as Walt

References

Bibliography
 Langman, Larry.  A Guide to American Crime Films of the Forties and Fifties. Greenwood Press, 1995.

External links
 

1951 films
1950s adventure drama films
American adventure drama films
Columbia Pictures films
Seafaring films
Films directed by William A. Berke
American black-and-white films
1950s English-language films
1950s American films